Surajgarh is a city and a municipal corporation in the district of Jhunjhunun in the sekhawati region of Indian state of Rajasthan. 

Surajgarh established by Raja surajmal singh ji shekhawat. Who was the first ruler/jagirdar of surajgarh estate.
Famous Surajgarh Nishan of khatu shyam ji from Shyam Darbar surajgarh

Amenities
Surajgarh Fort operates as a heritage hotel.

Religion 
Many old Hindu temples are found in Surajgarh.  

Bhairu ke Bagiche temple is on the Chirawa bypass.

Headmaster ji 
Rambilas Sharma served as headmaster Ji, who devoted his life to the development of Surajgarh. A book on his life and on Surajgarh is titled Headmaster ji: The Man with Literacy Mission. The Government of India, Postal Department honored Headmaster ji's contribution to society and released a special cover in memory of him during the first philately exhibition of Jhunjhunu in 2016.  Headmaster ji with Vinoba Bhave, Pt. Jawaharlal Nehru and others took part in Bhoodan Movement in Surajgarh from 1958-60.

Geography
It is around 180 Km from the national capital Delhi. The town is divided into two parts: Surajgarh Bazar (old Surajgarh), and Surajgarh Mandi. 

Shivalya lake is near Ghardu village.
Surajgarh is 12 Km away from chirawa.

Demographics
In the 2001 Indian census, Surajgarh had a population of 18,857, of which men made up 53%, and women 47%. Surajgarh has an average literacy rate of 65%, which is higher than the national average of 59.5%: The male literacy rate is 75%, while female literacy is 54%. In Surajgarh, 16% of the population is under 6 years of age.

Education
Surajgarh has many educational institutions (schools and degree colleges). Students from across Rajasthan and neighboring states study there. 

Schools include the Tagore Children Academy (Tagore Public Senior Secondary School), Saraswati, P. B. School, Govt. Girls School, St. Mann school, Surajgarh Academy etc., and colleges like RKJK Barasiya P.G. College, Tagore Girls College, Keystone Engineering College and Arya Nursing. Government College is also located in Surajgarh which was opened in year 2021 and it's a Hindi medium college which offers only BA course.

References

 Cities and towns in Jhunjhunu district